This is the order of battle for the Battle of Petrovaradin which was fought between Habsburg and Ottoman forces on July 5, 1716.

Order of battle

Imperial (Austrian) Army
Field Marshal Prince Eugene of Savoy

1st Line
Lieutenant Field Marshal Freiherr von FalkensteinGeneral of Cavalry Carl Alexandre Herzog von WurttembergGeneral of Cavalry 
Florentin Clemens Graf von Mercy

2nd Line

3rd Line

Skirmishers

Ottoman army
Silahdar Damat Ali Pasha (killed)

Sources

 Higgins, David R. "Peterwardein: Eugene Turns the Tide in Hungary 5 August 1716." in Strategy & Tactics, Number 248 (March/April 2008)

Orders of battle